United Artists (UA) was an American film and television entertainment studio founded in 1919 by D. W. Griffith, Charlie Chaplin, Mary Pickford, and Douglas Fairbanks. This is a list of feature films originally produced or distributed by United Artists, including those made overseas.
Note: The MGM films that United Artists distributed are now owned by Warner Bros. through Turner Entertainment.

This list will also include films from successor United Artists Releasing, a distribution joint-venture between Metro-Goldwyn-Mayer and Annapurna Pictures, as well as films that receives the United Artists copyright.

1910s

1920s

1930s

1940s

1950s

1960s

1970s

1980s

1990s

2000s

2010s

2020s

See also
 
 List of Metro-Goldwyn-Mayer films

References

United Artists
United Artists